Marilynn Minaker (born 12 November 1949) is a Canadian gymnast. She won a team silver medal at the 1967 Pan American Games and competed in six events at the 1968 Summer Olympics.

Early life
Minaker would do splits and cartwheels from an early age and considered herself to be "really flexible" and a tomboy. In 1963 when in eighth grade at Cedarbroole Public School, she was one of two students who won the provincial semi-final oratorical contest, having competed against "eight other outstanding speakers".

Career
By 1963, she was the junior gymnastics champion of Ontario and the top junior trampoline performer in Canada. At the age of 13, she was just a little too young to partake in the 1964 Summer Olympics. In 1966, she won a gold medal during the world game trials and the following year, won a team silver medal at the 1967 Pan American Games in Winnipeg.

While training for the world championships, a fall resulted in a blood clot forming on her brain and during tests in hospital, recalled a doctor noting that she would "never do gymnastics again". Her father, a church minister, took her to a faith healer the day before a scheduled operation in the hope that God would heal Minaker "if she would come forward". The following morning, she was in high spirits and energetic, citing God as helping to prosper her career. She competed in six events at the 1968 Summer Olympics.

Personal life
Minaker was born as the daughter of a minister and at a young age, "rebelled against religion", only understanding Christianity from around the age of 17. She won the Miss Scarborough Beauty contest in 1972. Her older brother won a silver medal for Canada in international wrestling.

References

External links

1949 births
Living people
Canadian female artistic gymnasts
Olympic gymnasts of Canada
Gymnasts at the 1968 Summer Olympics
Sportspeople from Kirkland Lake
Pan American Games silver medalists for Canada
Pan American Games medalists in gymnastics
Gymnasts at the 1967 Pan American Games
Medalists at the 1967 Pan American Games
20th-century Canadian women
21st-century Canadian women